Lanzer See is a lake in Kreis Herzogtum Lauenburg, Schleswig-Holstein, Germany. At an elevation of 8,55 m, its surface area is 19.5 ha.

Lakes of Schleswig-Holstein
LLanzerSee